Claude Trahan (17 March 1939 – 6 December 1975) was a Canadian ski jumper who competed in the 1968 Winter Olympics. He died in a car accident in 1975.

References

1939 births
1975 deaths
Canadian male ski jumpers
Olympic ski jumpers of Canada
Ski jumpers at the 1968 Winter Olympics
Road incident deaths in Canada